Suspense is a state of mental uncertainty, anxiety, being undecided, or being doubtful.  In a dramatic work, suspense is the anticipation of the outcome of a plot or of the solution to an uncertainty, puzzle, or mystery, particularly as it affects a character for whom one has sympathy.  However, suspense is not exclusive to fiction.

In drama 
In literature, films, television, and plays, suspense is a major device for securing and maintaining interest.  It may be of several major types:  in one, the outcome is uncertain and the suspense resides in the question of who, what, or how; in another, the outcome is inevitable from foregoing events, and the suspense resides in the audience's anxious or frightened anticipation in the question of when.  Readers feel suspense when they are deeply curious about what will happen next, or when they know what is likely to happen but don’t know how it will happen.  Even in historical fiction, with characters whose life stories are well known, the why usually brings suspense to the novel.

An adjunct to suspense is foreshadowing, as found in hints of national crisis or revolution in Isabel Allende’s House of the Spirits (1991).

Examples 
 In Sophocles' Oedipus Rex (429 B.C.), suspense is achieved through a withholding of the knowledge that Oedipus himself has killed Laius, his father.  During the play, the spectators, aware that Oedipus will eventually make the discovery, share the hero's uncertainties and fears as he pursues the truth of his own past.
 In George Washington Cable's story "Jean-ah Poquelin" (1875), the reader wants to know the cause of the strange smell and the unexplained disappearance of a brother.
 In Mark Twain's Pudd'nhead Wilson (1895), the reader anticipates the outcome of the switching of a black infant with a white infant.
 In Ernest J. Gaines's A Gathering of Old Men (1983), the reader waits for the court's decision at a murder trial.

Paradox of suspense 
Some authors have tried to explain the "paradox of suspense", namely: a narrative tension that remains effective even when uncertainty is neutralized, because repeat audiences know exactly how the story resolves. Some theories assume that true repeat audiences are extremely rare because, in reiteration, we usually forget many details of the story and the interest arises due to these holes of memory; others claim that uncertainty remains even for often told stories because, during the immersion in the fictional world, we forget fictionally what we know factually or because we expect fictional worlds to look like the real world, where exact repetition of an event is impossible.

The position of Yanal is more radical and postulates that narrative tension that remains effective in true repetition should be clearly distinguished from genuine suspense, because uncertainty is part of the definition of suspense. Baroni proposes to name rappel this kind of suspense whose excitement relies on the ability of the audience to anticipate perfectly what is to come, a precognition that is particularly enjoyable for children dealing with well-known fairy tales. Baroni adds that another kind of suspense without uncertainty can emerge with the occasional contradiction between what the reader knows about the future (cognition) and what he desires (volition), especially in tragedy, when the protagonist eventually dies or fails (suspense par contradiction).

See also 
 Adrenaline
 Cliffhanger
 Conflict (narrative)
 Fear
 Mystery fiction
 Mystery film
 Pace (narrative)
 Plot twist
 Red herring
 Thriller (genre)

Notes

References

Further reading 
 Baroni, R. (2009). L'oeuvre du temps. Poétique de la discordance narrative, Paris: Seuil.
 Brooks, P. (1984). Reading for the Plot: Design and Intention in Narrative, Cambridge: Harvard University Press.
 Grivel, C. (1973). Production de l'intérêt romanesque, Paris & The Hague: Mouton.
 Kiebel, E.M. (2009). The Effect of Directed Forgetting on Completed and Interrupted Tasks. Presented at the 2nd Annual Student-Faculty Research Celebration at Winona State University, Winona MN. See online .
 McKinney, F. (1935). "Studies in the retention of interrupted learning activities", Journal of Comparative Psychology, vol n° 19(2), p. 265–296.
 Phelan, J. (1989). Reading People, Reading Plots: Character, Progression, and the Interpretation of Narrative, Chicago, University of Chicago Press.
 Prieto-Pablos, J. (1998). "The Paradox of Suspense", Poetics, n° 26, p. 99–113.
 Ryan, M.-L. (1991), Possible Worlds, Artificial Intelligence, and Narrative Theory, Bloomington: Indiana University Press.
 Schaper, E. (1968), "Aristotle's Catharsis and Aesthetic Pleasure", The Philosophical Quarterly, vol. 18, n° 71, p. 131–143.
 Sternberg, M. (1978), Expositional Modes and Temporal Ordering in Fiction, Baltimore and London: Johns Hopkins University Press.
 Sternberg, M. (1992), "Telling in Time (II): Chronology, Teleology, Narrativity", Poetics Today, n° 11, p. 901–948.
 Sternberg, M. (2001), "How Narrativity Makes a Difference", Narrative, n° 9, (2), p. 115–122.
 Van Bergen, A. (1968) Task interruption. Amsterdam: North-Holland Publishing Company. 
 Vorderer, P., H. Wulff & M. Friedrichsen (eds) (1996). Suspense. Conceptualizations, Theoretical Analyses, and Empirical Explorations, Mahwah: Lawrence Erlbaum Associates.
 Zeigarnik, B. (1927). Das Behalten erledigter und unerledigter Handlungen. Psychologische Forschung, 9, 1–85.
 Zeigarnik, B. (1967). On finished and unfinished tasks. In W. D. Ellis (Ed.), A sourcebook of Gestalt psychology, New York: Humanities press.

External links 
 

Narrative techniques
Concepts in film theory
Memory
Emotions

kk:Зейгарник әсері